Hertig is a German language surname and a variant of the surname Hertwig, itself variant of Hartwig. Notable people with the name include:
 Charly Hertig (1939–2012), Swiss footballer and manager 
 Philippe Hertig (1965), Swiss former footballer

References 

German-language surnames
Surnames from given names
Surnames of Swiss origin